Pro*C (also known as Pro*C/C++) is an embedded SQL programming language used by Oracle Database DBMSes.  Pro*C uses either C or C++ as its host language.  During compilation, the embedded SQL statements are interpreted by a precompiler and replaced by C or C++ function calls to their respective SQL library.  The output from the Pro*C precompiler is standard C or C++ code that is then compiled by any one of several C or C++ compilers into an executable.

External links
 Introduction to Pro*C Embedded SQL
 
 Oracle 11.2 Pro*C/C++ Programmer's Guide

SQL
C programming language family
C (programming language)
C++
Oracle Database